Patricia Hall (born 16 October 1982) is a Jamaican sprinter. She competed in the 400 metres and the 4x400 metres relay events at the 2014 IAAF World Indoor Championships, winning a silver medal in the latter.

References

External links
 

1982 births
Living people
Jamaican female sprinters
Place of birth missing (living people)
World Athletics Indoor Championships medalists
20th-century Jamaican women
21st-century Jamaican women